Every Day Isn't Sunday (German: Alle Tage ist kein Sonntag) is a 1935 German comedy film directed by Walter Janssen and starring Adele Sandrock, Wolfgang Liebeneiner and Carola Höhn. It shares its name with an unrelated 1959 film of the same title. Both films feature the popular song of the same name by Carl Clewing. It was shot at the EFA Studios in Berlin. The film's sets were designed by the art director Heinrich Richter.

Cast
 Adele Sandrock as Frau Faber
 Wolfgang Liebeneiner as Erich Sieber, ihr Enkel
 Wilhelm P. Krüger as Heinrich Peters
 Carola Höhn as Margot, seine Tochter
 Erich Kestin as Walter Neumann, Siebers Freund
 Paul Henckels as Hermann Wagner, Zigarrenhändler
 Anni Markart as Hanni Wittler, Verkäuferin
 Vivigenz Eickstedt as Architekt Zimmermann
Erich Fiedler as Roeder, Hochstaple
 Willi Schaeffers as Dr. Marr, sein Komplize
 Hans Nerking as Kriminalkommissar Meißner
 Hellmuth Passarge as Erster Geselle

References

Bibliography 
 James L. Limbacher. Haven't I seen you somewhere before?: Remakes, sequels, and series in motion pictures and television, 1896-1978. Pierian Press, 1979.
 Klaus, Ulrich J. Deutsche Tonfilme: Jahrgang 1933. Klaus-Archiv, 1988.

External links 
 

1935 films
1935 comedy films
German comedy films
Films of Nazi Germany
1930s German-language films
Films directed by Walter Janssen
German black-and-white films
1930s German films
Films shot at Halensee Studios